The 2003–04 FA Women's Premier League Cup was the 13th edition of the English football cup tournament for teams at both levels of the FA Women's Premier League (level 1, the National Division, and level 2, the Northern and Southern Divisions). The 2004 cup final was won by Charlton, who defeated Fulham 1-0, with the only goal of the game scored by Emma Coss.

References

2003–04 in English women's football
Charlton Athletic W.F.C. matches
FA Women's National League Cup